"Red Rain" is the first track on English rock musician Peter Gabriel's 1986 solo studio album So. In the United States, it was the second single from the album and reached number three on Billboard magazine's Mainstream Rock chart in 1986, where it stayed for three weeks between July and August. In the rest of the world it was not released until 1987 and received less airplay and fewer sales, peaking at 46 in the UK singles chart after entering the chart in July of that year. A live version also charted in the US and the UK in 1994.

Background and reception
The song is a combination of several inspirations. The lyrics directly reference a recurring dream Gabriel was having where he swam in his backyard pool drinking cold red wine. Another version of the dream had bottles in the shape of people falling from a cliff. In it, a stream of red liquid would seep out of the people-shaped bottles as they smashed with impact onto the ground, and was usually followed by a torrential downpour of the same red liquid.

Earlier in his solo career, Gabriel had an idea for a movie he referred to as Mozo. In it, villagers were punished for their sins with a blood-red rain. "Red Rain" was to be the theme song. This idea was eventually scrapped, although there was a mention of Mozo in the song "On the Air" in Peter Gabriel (II). "Down The Dolce Vita", "Here Comes The Flood", and "Exposure" reference the Mozo story, as well.

Strongly percussive in nature, the song features two notable American drummers: Stewart Copeland from the Police played the hi-hat for the rain-like background sound and was requested by Gabriel due to his mastery of the instrument, while the rest of the drumming was provided by Gabriel's regular drummer Jerry Marotta. Gabriel's biographer Daryl Easlea wrote that the song was "a brooding opening to the album" which reflected "two very current Eighties obsessions: AIDS and nuclear fallout". Stephen Thomas Erlewine has described it as "a stately anthem popular on album rock radio".

"Red Rain" album appearances 

So (1986)
Shaking the Tree (1990)
Secret World Live (Live, 1994)
Hit (2003)
Live Blood (2012)

Track listing 
 "Red Rain"
 "In Your Eyes" (special mix) [only on 12"]
 "Ga-Ga"

"Ga-Ga" is an instrumental version of the song "I Go Swimming", which was only released on the Plays Live album.

Track listing (US 12" Single (20749-0)) 
 "Red Rain" – 5:35
 "Ga-Ga (I Go Swimming instrumental)" – 4:31
 "Walk Through the Fire" – 3:31

Personnel
Jerry Marotta – drums
Chris Hughes – Linn programming
Stewart Copeland – hi-hat
Tony Levin – bass guitar
David Rhodes – guitar, backing vocals
Daniel Lanois – guitar
Peter Gabriel – vocals, piano, CMI, Prophet-5
Kevin Killen – mixer

References 

1986 songs
1987 singles
Geffen Records singles
Peter Gabriel songs
Song recordings produced by Chris Hughes (record producer)
Song recordings produced by Daniel Lanois
Songs written by Peter Gabriel
Songs about HIV/AIDS
Songs about nuclear war and weapons